The Putumayo River or Içá River is one of the tributaries of the Amazon River, southwest of and parallel to the Japurá River.

Course
The Putumayo River forms part of Colombia's border with Ecuador, as well as most of the border with Peru. Known as the Putumayo in the former three nations, it is called the Içá when it crosses into Brazil. The Putumayo originates in the Andes Mountains east of the city of Pasto, Colombia. It empties into the Solimões (upper Amazon) near the municipality of Santo Antônio do Içá, Brazil. Major tributaries include the Guamués River, San Miguel, Güeppí, Cumpuya, Algodón, Igara-Paraná, Yaguas, Cotuhé, and Paraná de Jacurapá rivers.
The river flows through the Solimões-Japurá moist forests ecoregion.

History

Exploration
In the late 19th century, the Içá was navigated by the French explorer Jules Crevaux (1847–1882). He ascended it in a steamer drawing  of water, and running day and  night. Cuembí is only  from the Pacific Ocean, in a straight line, passing through the town of Pasto in southern Colombia. Creveaux discovered the river sediments to be free of rock to the base of the Andes; the river banks were of argillaceous earth and the bottom of fine sand.

Rubber boom era
During the Amazon rubber boom of the late 19th and early 20th centuries, the land around the Putumayo became a major rubber-producing region, where Julio César Arana's Peruvian Amazon Company maintained a production network centered on the nearby city of Iquitos. This production network mainly relied on the labor of indigenous Indians, who suffered from widespread human rights abuses. These abuses were first publicized in 1909 within the British press by the American engineer Walter Hardenburg, who had been briefly imprisoned by Arana's private police force in 1907 while visiting the region; Hardenburg later published his book The Putumayo: The Devil's Paradise in 1913.

In response to Hardenburg's exposé, the British government sent the consul Roger Casement (who had previously publicized Belgian atrocities in the rubber business of the Congo Free State) to investigate the matter; between 1910 and 1911, Casement subsequently wrote a series of condemnatory reports criticizing the atrocities of the PAC, for which he received a knighthood.

Casement's reports later formed much of the basis for the 1987 book Shamanism, Colonialism, and the Wild Man by the anthropologist Michael Taussig, which analyzed how the acts of terror committed by British capitalists along the Putumayo River in Colombia had created a distinct "space of death."

Modern-day
Today the river is a major transport route. Almost the entire length of the river is navigated by boats.

Cattle farming, along with the rubber trade, is also a major industry on the banks of the Içá. Rubber and balatá (a substance very much like gutta-percha, to the point where it is often called gutta-balatá) from the Içá area are shipped to Manaus, Brazil.

On March 1, 2008, Raúl Reyes and 14 of his fellow Revolutionary Armed Forces of Colombia guerrilla companions were killed while on the Ecuadorian side of the border by Colombian military forces.

In November 2019, scientists from the Field Museum worked with partners from Colombia and Peru to perform a three-week "rapid inventory" of almost 7 million acres around the Putumayo, one of the few Amazonian rivers that remains undammed, documenting 1706 species. The goal of these fast surveys of remote areas is to bring together local stakeholders to collaboratively protect wilderness.

References

External links
 
 Hardenburg, W.E. 1913. The Putumayo: The Devil's Paradise—Travels in the Peruvian Amazon Region and An Account of The Atrocities Committed Upon the Indians Therein.  London: T. Fisher Unwin.  https://archive.org/details/putumayodevilspa00hardrich

Tributaries of the Amazon River
Rivers of Colombia
Rivers of Ecuador
Rivers of Peru
Border rivers
Rivers of Amazonas (Brazilian state)
Colombia–Peru border
Colombia–Ecuador border
International rivers of South America
Rivers of Loreto Region
Geography of Sucumbíos Province